BC Children's Hospital Foundation (BCCHF) is a Canadian non-profit registered charity that raises money to support the British Columbia Children's Hospital. The Foundation works with communities to raise funds for essentials including: life-saving equipment, research into childhood diseases, a wide range of medical staff and community child health education programs. Since 1982, BC Children's Hospital Foundation has partnered with children, families, health professionals, and other British Columbia residents to raise funds to support BC Children's Hospital, Sunny Hill Health Centre for Children, and the BC Children's Hospital Research Institute.

References

External links
 BC Children's Hospital Foundation Official website

1982 establishments in British Columbia
Non-profit organizations based in Vancouver
Health charities in Canada
Medical and health organizations based in British Columbia